I'm with Her is an American sitcom television series created by Chris Henchy and Marco Pennette, starring David Sutcliffe and Teri Polo, that aired on ABC from September 23, 2003 to April 27, 2004.

Synopsis
The series, loosely based on creator Chris Henchy's relationship with wife Brooke Shields, begins on that chance meeting. Patrick Owen (David Sutcliffe), a down-to-earth and dedicated high school teacher, grabs a cup of coffee with his best friend and fellow teacher Stevie (Danny Comden), when he's bitten by a dog. The owner of the dog is famous movie star Alex Young (Teri Polo). Over her apologies, Patrick recognizes Alex and makes light of the situation. Before leaving, Alex gives Patrick her phone number so he can contact her for any medical costs incurred.

Despite the incessant pleading of Stevie to call her, Patrick feels that Alex is out of his league. Back at Alex's house, her overprotective, cynical and bitter sister, Cheri (Rhea Seehorn), panics about the dog biting and how Alex could give a complete stranger their phone number. Alex is not as suspicious, and slightly hopeful that he'll call. Cheri has her doubts, thinking it's a bad idea for Alex to be interested in a "civilian" (someone not in the biz). However, fate and chemistry prove stronger than perceived impressions, and Alex and Patrick begin dating. Patrick is unprepared for the chaos that comes with Alex. He loses his anonymity and is stalked by paparazzi, which jeopardizes his job. Stevie adds to the problem with his constant busy-bodying and attempts to force his way into the relationship of Patrick and this huge star.

The season finale, which was also the series finale, was left on a cliffhanger which was never resolved as the series was canceled after 22 episodes.

Cast
Teri Polo as Alex Young
David Sutcliffe as Patrick Owen
Danny Comden as Stevie Hanson
Rhea Seehorn as Cheri Baldzikowski

Production
Marco Pennette and Chris Henchy, who co-created the series, were the executive producers along with Mike Tollin, Brian Robbins, Joe Davola and Jack Burditt.

Episodes

References

External links
 
 

2000s American romantic comedy television series
2000s American sitcoms
2003 American television series debuts
2004 American television series endings
American Broadcasting Company original programming
English-language television shows
Television series by Tollin/Robbins Productions
Television series by Warner Bros. Television Studios